Shangchen is a Lower Palaeolithic archaeological site in Lantian County, Shaanxi, China, some 25 km south of Weinan.
It was discovered in 1964, and excavated during 2004 and 2017.

Stone tools found at the site were dated based on magnetostratigraphy  in a 2018 study. Artefacts were found in 17 layers, dated to between 1.26 Ma (palaeosol S15) and 2.12 Ma (loess L28). The date of 2.12 Ma predates the earliest known fossils of archaic humans in Eurasia (Homo erectus georgicus) by 300,000 years.

Location 
The archaeological site is on the cliff faces of a gully in the Loess Plateau.
Because loess is a soil made by extremely fine particles blown in by the wind, all larger rocks found in loess deposits had to have been carried in by humans or other animals.

Discovery and excavation 
Lantian County is where fossils of the Homo erectus, now called Lantian Man, were discovered in 1964. The oldest fossil, a skull, was initially dated to 1.15 million years ago. In 2001, geologist Zhu Zhaoyu and other scientists began researching the site again, and determined that the skull was 1.63 million years old.

Zhu's team surveyed the region around the fossil site, and discovered stone tools buried deep in the side of a gully in Shangchen, less than three miles away. The team, later joined by British paleoanthropologist Robin Dennell in 2010, thoroughly searched the gully and excavated the site between 2004 and 2017, and their findings were published in July 2018 in the journal Nature. 

A total of 96 stone tools have been found at Shangchen, including flakes, points, and cores. They were found in 17 artefact layers.

Date 
The oldest artefact-bearing layer at the site was dated at 2.12 million years ago, while the youngest was dated to 1.26 million years, indicating that the site was occupied (not necessarily continuously) for 850,000 years.
Some of the tools were found with bone fragments of animals including deer and bovines. Even older remains may still lie undiscovered, as the deepest layers at Shangchen are inaccessible as of 2018 because the area is "actively farmed".

The findings are highly significant as they represent one of the earliest evidence of Homo outside Africa after Masol(fr) in India, surpassing Dmanisi in the Caucasus region of Georgia, which was the previously known oldest Lower Paleolithic site outside Africa, dating to 1.85 million years ago. 
It is also older than the Yuanmou Man, the oldest hominin fossils found in East Asia, dating to 1.7 million years. 
As the Shangchen site lacks volcanic minerals which are abundant in African sites, the study dated the sediments using the paleomagnetism method. 

The authors of the study argue that a natural origin of the claimed artefacts is ruled out as Shangchen and its immediate vicinity have no known ancient rivers, which might have carved natural rocks into shapes resembling human-made tools.
Uninvolved scientists  who reviewed the findings such as Michael Petraglia, an archaeologist at the Max Planck Institute for the Science of Human History in Jena, Germany consider the dates convincing.

Study co-author Robin Dennell talking to a Nature News reporter was cited as speculating that
"the Shangchen toolmakers belonged to an earlier species in the genus Homo" than H. erectus, and one William Jungers (unaffiliated with the study) is cited as even reserving "the possibility that the Shangchen toolmaker was a species of Australopithecus".

References

External links

2018 archaeological discoveries
History of Xi'an
Paleolithic sites in China
Homo erectus sites